Donell Tyrell Arnold Thomas (born 4 August 2003) is an English professional footballer who plays as a midfielder for  club Bishop's Stortford, on loan from  club Colchester United.

Career
Thomas came through the Academy at Colchester United and made his first-team debut on 21 March 2022, when he came on as an 85th-minute substitute for Brendan Sarpong-Wiredu in a 1–0 defeat to Forest Green Rovers at Brunton Park. Manager Wayne Brown said that "it's always tough asking a young lad to come on and make an impact but I thought he did that". On 2 September 2022, he joined Bishop's Stortford of the Isthmian League Premier Division on loan until 4 January.

Career statistics

References

2003 births
Living people
Footballers from Hackney, London
English footballers
Association football midfielders
Colchester United F.C. players
Bishop's Stortford F.C. players
English Football League players
Isthmian League players
Black British sportspeople